Jiaoqu is a district of Tongling, Anhui province, China.

In October 2018, Tongling City implemented zoning adjustment, Zongyang County Laozhou Town, Chenyaohu Town, and Zhoutan Town were placed under the jurisdiction of Jiaoqu District.

Administrative divisions
Jiaoqu District is divided to 2 subdistrict, 5 towns, and 1 township.
 Qiaonan Subdistrict
 Anqingkuangqu Subdistrict

2 Towns
 Datong
 Tongshan
 Laozhou
 Chenyaohu
 Zhoutan

1 Township
 Huihe Township

References

Tongling
County-level divisions of Anhui